Genoplesium nudum, commonly known as the tiny midge orchid in Australia or the red midge orchid in New Zealand, is a small terrestrial orchid native to south-eastern Australia and New Zealand. It has a single thin leaf fused to the flowering stem and up to forty small, reddish-purple or green and red flowers. Australian and New Zealand authorities use the name Corunastylis nuda but Genoplesium nudum and Prasophyllum transversum are used by the World Checklist of Selected Plant Families.

Description
The flowers are inverted so that the labellum is above the column rather than below it. There is a channelled, egg-shaped callus in the centre of the labellum and extending almost to its tip. Flowering occurs between December and March in Australia and until August in New Zealand.

Taxonomy and naming
The tiny midge orchid was first formally described in 1853 by Joseph Dalton Hooker who gave it the name Prasophyllum nudum and published the description in Flora Novae-Zelandiae. In 1989, David Jones and Mark Clements changed the name to Genoplesium nudum and in 2002 changed the name again to Corunastylis nuda. The specific epithet (nuda) is a Latin word meaning "bare" or "naked".

Prasophyllum transversum was formally described by Robert D. FitzGerald in 1888 but Jones and Clements regarded this as a synonym of Genoplesium nudum, now known as C. nuda in the countries where it occurs.

Distribution and habitat
Genoplesium nudum usually grows in moist, grassy forest. It is found New South Wales south from the New England region, in eastern Victoria, in Tasmania and in the North, South and Chatham Islands of New Zealand.

Ecology
Most species of Genoplesium and Corunastylis are pollinated by small vinegar flies but C. nuda is self-pollinating and reproduces solely by seed. It does not seem to require fire before flowering but often appears in disturbed sites.

Conservation
The tiny midge orchid is widespread and common throughout its range, except in Tasmania, where it is listed as "Rare" under the Tasmanian Threatened Species Protection Act 1995. It is threatened in that state by land clearing, forestry activities and inappropriate fire regimes.

References

External links
 
 

nudum
Flora of Australia
Flora of New Zealand
Plants described in 1853